Saraswathi Narayanan College, is a general degree college located in Perungudi, Madurai district, Tamil Nadu. It was established in the year 1966. The college is affiliated with Madurai Kamaraj University. This college offers different courses in arts, commerce and science.

Departments

Science

Physics
Chemistry
Mathematics
Computer Science
Botany
Zoology

Arts and Commerce

Tamil
English
History
Economics
Commerce

Accreditation
The college is  recognized by the University Grants Commission (UGC).

References

External links

Educational institutions established in 1966
1966 establishments in Madras State
Colleges affiliated to Madurai Kamaraj University
Universities and colleges in Madurai district